David Collingwood Jiles (born 28 September 1953) is the Anson Marston Distinguished Professor of Engineering and holder of the Palmer Endowed Department Chair in Electrical and Computer Engineering at Iowa State University.

Career
Born in London, Jiles received a BSc from the University of Exeter (1975), followed by a MSc from the University of Birmingham (1976), a PhD from the University of Hull (1979), and a DSc from the University of Birmingham (1990). Jiles was formerly Professor of Magnetics at Cardiff University and the director of the Wolfson Centre for Magnetics there from 2005 to 2010.  Prior to that, he had been at Iowa State as Anson Marston Distinguished Professor of Engineering. Jiles was named a Jefferson Fellow at the United States Department of State in January 2016, a post that is set to begin in August and last for one year.

Honors
He has been the editor-in-chief of IEEE Transactions on Magnetics since 2005. He is a Fellow of the American Physical Society, the  Institute of Electrical and Electronics Engineers, the Institution of Electrical Engineers, the Institute of Physics, the Institute of Materials, the Institute of Mathematics and its Applications, the Magnetics Society, and the Royal Academy of Engineering.

Personal
He raised money for United Way of America's Story County branch with a blindfolded chess tournament in 2013.

Publications

Books
Introduction to Magnetism and Magnetic Materials,  London and New York: Chapman and Hall Publishers,. (in 535 libraries according to WorldCat)    1st edition 1991.  2nd edition 1998.
Review, Choice, v29 n05  
Introduction to the Electronic Properties of Materials,   London and New York: Chapman and Hall Publishers,. First edition 1994. Second edition 2001.
Introduction to the Principles of Materials Evaluation,  Boca Raton, Florida: CRC Press, 2007.

See also
Jiles–Atherton model

References

External links
Faculty profile at Iowa State

Living people
Iowa State University faculty
British expatriate academics in the United States
British electronics engineers
Alumni of the University of Exeter
Alumni of the University of Birmingham
Alumni of the University of Hull
Academics of Cardiff University
Fellows of the Royal Academy of Engineering
Fellows of the Institute of Physics
Fellows of the Institute of Mathematics and its Applications
Fellows of the American Physical Society
Fellow Members of the IEEE
Fellows of the Institution of Electrical Engineers
1953 births